Riparian Plaza is a 53-storey skyscraper located in the central business district of Brisbane, Queensland, Australia. It was Brisbane's tallest building until it was surpassed by Aurora in 2006 and is a particularly iconic building on the Brisbane skyline. It is a mixed use building, with 11 car park levels from the ground up, 25 commercial levels, and 12 residential levels originally housing 50 penthouse apartments.

On top of the tower is a  communications spire. A recreation centre including a swimming pool is located on 39th floor, between the commercial and residential sections. The carpark is accessed via a helical annexe. The tower has an open plaza and promenade space totaling . The upper plaza level contains Madame Wu, an Asian Fusion restaurant.

The building was developed by Bloomberg Incorporation Limited with a construction cost of A$130 million. Bloomberg retained ownership of the  commercial component and sold off the residential apartments during construction. It is located at 71 Eagle Street, and was the last waterfront vacant block in the Brisbane CBD. Riparian Plaza provided the first, new, premium office space available in the Brisbane CBD for a decade. Brisbane Square completed in 2006, was the next major office building constructed in Brisbane.

Construction and design
Riparian Plaza was designed by Harry Seidler (architect) and Robert Bird Group (structural engineer). Most office spaces have river views, due to the 45-degree angle to the river of the building and the lack of columns on these mid level floors. Each penthouse has its own curvilinear, projecting terrace that faces the river. The cantilevering balconies have a highly sculptured shape. Seidler claimed the composite stacking of sectors vertically is unique in Australia.

There were significant delays in the completion of the building.  It was originally scheduled to be completed by early 2004 (giving a record construction time of 100 weeks).  This date was continually pushed back. The delay led to significant criticism of the project in the local media, as well as complaints from prospective tenants of the building and withdrawal of committed tenants.  The building was completed in November 2005.

In October 2007, Riparian Plaza won the top prize for commercial architecture at the annual national architecture awards. In 2008, the building won the overall winner of the Rider Levett Bucknall / Property Council of Australia Award and the Property Council of Australia Award for Mixed Use Development.

Incidents
The building made headlines in 2005 when a severe storm caused two window washers to become stranded on the 30th floor. Rescue operations were successful after a pane of glass was removed to reach them.

A large panel of glass from pool fencing on level 39 crashed to Eagle Street in the early morning hours of 27 August 2009, creating a mess but no injuries.

Tenants
Office tenants include broker Wilson HTM and law firm Clayton Utz and Littles Lawyers. KPMG’s Brisbane office occupies levels 14 to 19. John Pearce, former CEO of the nearby Collection House, paid $6.7 million for the top penthouse.

The building has attracted significant investor interest with median capital growth at 24.8% during 2007 and 27% in 2008. The building currently contains only 47 apartments, however there were 52 in the original design. Due to a flexible body corporate apartment amalgamations have been permitted and even encouraged because they enhance the exclusivity and therefore the price of the apartments.

In popular culture
The exterior of the building was a filming location for the 2009 science-fiction thriller film Daybreakers.

Gallery

See also

Aurora Tower
Central Plaza
Riverside Centre
Waterfront Place
List of tallest buildings in Brisbane
List of tallest buildings in Australia

References

External links
Riparian Plaza official site
Riparian Plaza apartments
Riparian Plaza Structural Engineers Statement

Harry Seidler buildings
Skyscrapers in Brisbane
Buildings and structures completed in 2005
Office buildings in Brisbane
Apartment buildings in Brisbane
Brisbane central business district
Skyscraper office buildings in Australia
Residential skyscrapers in Australia